Chisholm (Canada 2016 Census population 1,291) is a township in Northeastern Ontario, Canada, located in the Nipissing District.

Maps show the township as comprising the communities of Alderdale, Booth's Landing, Chiswick, Fossmill, Grahamvale and Wasing, however, these communities are now little more than slightly denser areas of housing, or completely abandoned in the case of Fossmill.  The township administrative offices are located in Chiswick. Alderdale, Fossmill, Grahamvale, and Wasing were all once stops or milepoints along the Canadian National Railway Alderdale Subdivision. Rail service declined in the mid-20th century and was eliminated altogether in 1996.

Demographics 

See also
List of townships in Ontario
List of francophone communities in Ontario

References

External links

Municipalities in Nipissing District
Single-tier municipalities in Ontario
Township municipalities in Ontario